Rockstar is the third studio album by Italian rapper Sfera Ebbasta. The album was released by Def Jam Recordings on 19 January 2018. The album peaked at number one on the Italian Albums Chart and it stayed on top of the chart for four weeks. Rockstar received 35 million streams on its first week on Spotify, and Sfera Ebbasta was the first Italian artist to appear on the streaming platform's Top 100 global chart. All of its 11 tracks entered on the first twelve positions of the Italian Singles Chart simultaneously. A deluxe edition (titled Popstar Edition) was released on 30 November 2018.

Track listing

Chart performance

Weekly charts

Year-end charts

Certifications

References

2018 albums
Def Jam Recordings albums
Italian-language albums
Sfera Ebbasta albums